Mary Ann Browne (also known as Mrs. James Gray; 24 September 1812 – 28 January 1845) was an English poet and writer of musical scores.

Biography
Mary Ann (sometimes Mary-Anne) Browne was born in Maidenhead, Berkshire, 24 September 1812. She was the eldest of three children. Though some sources mention Felicia Hemans was her sister, that is not the case.

A collection of her verses came before the public when she was only fifteen years of age. Browne wrote Mont Blanc, Ada, Bepentance, The Coronal, The Birthday Gift, Ignatia, Sacred Poetry, and many fugitive pieces in periodicals.

In 1840, her family removed to Liverpool. In 1842, she married James Gray, a Scotchman, and a nephew of James Hogg. She was remembered for piety and charity. 

Mary Ann Browne Gray died 28 January 1845 at Sunday's Well, Cork, Ireland.

Selected works

Musical scores
 The captive knight : a ballad, 18-- 
 The messenger bird, a duett, 1826 (with George E. Blake)
 The sunset tree, Tyrolese evening hymn, 1826 (with George E Blake)
 The Pilgrim Fathers, 1827
 The recall, 1827-33 (with Charles Bradlee)
 Evening song to the Virgin, (at sea) A duett., 183- (with Edward S Mesier)
 The blue sea, song of a Greek islander in exile,, 183- (with Edward S Mesier)

Songs
 Twelve popular songs, 18-- (with Edward F. Rimbault)
 The better land
 The breaking waves dash high
 The bridal of Andalla
 Landing of the Pilgrims
 Plymouth rock
 Treasures of the deep

Poetry
 Mont Blanc, and other poems by Mary Ann Browne, in her fifteenth year., 1827
 Ada, and other poems, 1828
 Repentance: And Other Poems, 1829
 The coronal; original poems, sacred and miscellaneous., 1833
 Ignatia, and other poems, 1838

Notes

References

Bibliography

External links

 

1812 births
1845 deaths
19th-century English poets
19th-century English women writers
19th-century English writers
19th-century British writers
English women poets
People from Maidenhead